Shiva is a Hindu deity worshipped by Shaivaites in India as the destroyer of ignorance spread all across the universe. As one of the three main gods in the Hindu pantheon, there are temples dedicated to his worship in India (and abroad). The most prominent of these are the Jyotirlinga temples. In Shaivism, Shiva is the god of all and is described as worshipped by all, including Devas (gods) like Brahma, vishnu and Indra, Asuras (demons) like Banasura and Ravana, humans like Adi Shankara and Nayanars, and creatures as diverse as Jatayu, an eagle, and Vali, an ape. Deities, rishis (sages), and grahas (planets) worshipped Shiva and established Shivalingas in various places.

The 12 Jyotirlinga temples
The 12 Jyotirlinga temples as mentioned in the Shiva Purana are :-

Pancha Bootha Sthalas (Five Elemental Manifestations) 

In South India, five temples of Shiva are held to be particularly important, as being manifestations of him in the five elemental substances.

Panchaaraama temples 

The Pancharama Kshetras (or the Pancharamas) are five ancient Hindu temples of Lord Shiva situated in Andhra Pradesh. The Sivalingas at these temples are made from a single Sivalinga. As per the legend, this Sivalinga was owned by the demon king Tarakasura. No one could win over him due to the power of this Sivalinga. Finally, Lord Kumaraswamy, the son of Lord Shiva broke the Sivalinga into five pieces and killed Tarakasura. The five pieces of Sivalinga fell at five different places on earth namely,

Sabha temples 

The five temples located in Tamil Nadu where Shiva is believed to perform Bharata Natyam dance are:

Ashta Veeratta Temples

Shani Parihara Temples

Kashiswar Jiu temple 

Kashiswar Jiu temple (काशीश्वर जिउ मंदिर) is in Andul of Howrah district near the Saraswati river, West Bengal in India. The presiding deity is a Banlinga which was recovered from the river in mid 17th century by Kashiswar Datta Chowdhury, a local zamindar. In 18th century a stone made yoni-like structure (Gauripatta) that symbolizes goddess Shakti has been attached with the Linga after Bargi attacked in 1741 AD. The deity is considered to be one of the oldest in the district. 

The temples are presently run by SrisriKashiswar Debottur Trust.

Notable temples

Andhra Pradesh 

 Kotappakonda
 Kukkuteswara Temple, East Godavari
 Pallikondeswara Temple, Surutapalli
 Kapila Theertham, Tirupati

Assam 

 Mahabhairav Temple, Tezpur
 Sivasagar Sivadol, Sivasagar
 Sukreswar Temple, Guwahati
 Umananda Temple, Guwahati

Bihar 

 Araria district
 Sundarnath Temple at Araria

 Bhagalpur district
 Burhanath Temple at Bhagalpur
 Budhanath Temple at Bhagalpur

 Buxar district
 Shri Adinath Akhara at Buxar

 Darbhanga district
 Mittheswarnath Shiv Temple at Chunabhatti

 East Champaran district
 Ugna Mahadev Temple at Bhawanipur Village

 Kaimur district
 Mundeshwari Temple at Ramgarh Village

 Lakhisarai district
 Ashokdham Temple

 Madhubani district
 Kapileshwar Temple at Rahika Town
 Parasmaninath Temple at Madhubani
 Ugna Mahadev Mandir

 Muzaffarpur district
 Baba Garib Sthan Mandir at Muzaffarpur

 Patna district
 Nair temple at Patna

 Samastipur district
 Khudneshwar Asthan Morwa at Morwa North Village

 Vaishali district
 Chaumukhi Mahadev at Basarh
 Lal Keshwar Shiv Temple
 Pataleshwar Mandir

Chhattisgarh 

Bhoramdeo Temple
Mahadev Temple, Deobaloda

Goa 

Mahadev Temple, Tambdi Surla
Mangueshi Temple
Nagueshi Temple, Bandora
Ramnathi Temple, Bandora
Saptakoteshwar, Narve
Vimleshwar Temple, Rivona

Gujarat 

 Somnath temple, Veraval

Jammu and Kashmir 

 Amarnath

Karnataka 

 Dharmasthala Temple, Dakshina Kannada
 Kadri Manjunath Temple, Dakshina Kannada
 Mahabaleshwar Temple, Gokarna, Uttara Kannada
 Murudeshwara, Uttara Kannada
 Bhoganandishwara Temple, Chikkaballapur
 Hoysaleswara Temple, Halebidu
 Kotilingeshwara, Kolar
 Srikanteshwara Temple, Nanjangud

Kerala 

 Chengannur Mahadeva Temple, Chengannur
 Elannummel Shiva temple
 Ernakulam Shiva Temple, Ernakulam
 Ettumanoor Mahadevar Temple, Ettumanoor
 Jagannath Temple, Thalassery
 Kolathukara Shiva Temple
 Kottiyoor Temple, Kottiyoor
 Pazhaya Sreekanteswaram Temple
 Poonkunnam Siva Temple, Punkunnam
 Rajarajeshwara Temple, Taliparamba
 Sree Bhavaneeswara Temple, Palluruthy
 Sreekanteswaram, Thiruvananthapuram
 Thiru Nayathode Siva Narayana Temple
 Vadakkunnathan Temple, Thrissur
 Vaikom Temple, Vaikom
 Vazhappally Maha Siva Temple

Madhya Pradesh 

Chhatarpur District
Brahma Temple at Khajuraho
Duladeo Temple at Khajuraho
Lalguan Mahadeva Temple at Khajuraho
Matangeshvara Temple at Khajuraho
Vishvanatha Temple at Khajuraho

Hoshangabad District
Jatashankar Cave Temple at Pachmarhi

Khandwa District
Omkareshwar Temple at Mandhata or Shivpuri

Mandsaur District
Pashupatinath Temple at Mandsaur

Morena District
Kakanmath Temple at Sihoniya

Neemuch District
Sukhanand Mahadev Ji Temple at Jawad

Raisen District
Bhojeshwar Temple at Bhojpur

Seoni District
Shri Kala Bhairava Nath Swami Temple at Adegaon

Ujjain District
Kal Bhairav Temple at Ujjain
Mahakaleshwar Jyotirlinga Temple at Ujjain
Mangalnath Temple at Ujjain

Maharashtra 

 Aurangabad District
 Kailasa Temple at Ellora Caves

 Kolhapur District
 Kopeshwar Temple, Khidrapur 

 Mumbai City District
 Babulnath Temple at Malabar Hill
 Walkeshwar Temple at Walkeshwar

 Nashik District
 Gondeshwar Temple at Sinnar
 Trimbakeshwar Shiva Temple at Trimbak City

 Palghar District
 Shiv Mandir, Maharashtra at Vangaon
 Tungareshwar Temple at Vasai,

 Pune District
 Bhimashankar Temple at Pune District

Odisha 

 Akhandalamani Temple, Bhadrak
 Baba Bhusandeswar Temple, Balasore
 Chandaneswar, Balasore
 Dhabaleswar, Cuttack
 Gupteswar Cave temple, Jeypore
 Kapilash Temple, Dhenkanal
 Leaning Temple of Huma, Sambalpur
 Lingaraja Temple, Bhubaneswar
 Mahavinayak Temple, Jajpur
 Mukteshvara Temple, Bhubaneswar
 Parashurameshvara Temple, Bhubaneswar

Punjab 

 Mukteshwar Mahadev Temple, Pathankot

Rajasthan 

 Sabli Temple, Dungarpur district

Sikkim 

 Kirateshwar Mahadev Temple, Legship

Tamil Nadu 

 Adi Kumbeswarar Temple, Kumbakonam
 Airavatesvara Temple, Darasuram
 Ardhanareeswarar Temple, Tiruchengode
 Arunachalesvara Temple, Tiruvannamalai
 Bhavani Sangameswarar Temple, Bhavani
 Brihadisvara Temple, Thanjavur
 Chandra Choodeswarar Temple, Hosur
 Isha Foundation, Coimbatore
 Jalantheeswarar Temple, Thakkolam
 Kapaleeshwarar Temple, Chennai
 Kasi Viswanathar Temple, Tenkasi 
 Marundeeswarar Temple, Chennai
 Masilamaniswara Temple, Thirumullaivoyal
 Meenakshi Temple, Madurai
 Pariyur Kondathu Kaliamman Temple, Pariyur
 Perur Pateeswarar Temple, Coimbatore 
 Sankaranayinarkoil, Sankarankovil
 Sathyanatheswarar Temple, Kanchipuram
 Thayumanaswami Temple, Tiruchirappalli
 Thyagaraja Temple, Tiruvarur
 Vedapureeswarar Temple, Thiruverkadu
 Virundeeswarar Temple, Coimbatore

Telangana 

 Chaya Someswara Temple in Nalgonda Telangana
 Ramappa Temple, Warangal
 Keesaragutta Temple in Keesaragutta, Medchal-Malkajgiri district,Telangana

Uttarakhand 

 Baijnath, Uttarakhand
 Baleshwar Temple, Champawat
 Daksheswar Mahadev Temple, Kankhal
 Gopinath Mandir, Chamoli Gopeshwar
 Jageshwar, Almora
 Kalpeshwar
 Kedarnath Temple, Kedarnath
 Madhyamaheshwar
 Neelkanth Mahadev Temple, near Rishikesh
 Panch Kedar
 Rudranath
 Rudreshwar Mahadev Temple
 Tungnath, Chamoli district

Uttar Pradesh 

 Ghuisarnath Temple, Pratapgarh
 Hajari Mahadev Temple, Etawah
 Lodheshwar Mahadev Mandir, Barabanki
 Shivdwar Uma Maheshwar Temple, Sonbhadra
 Waneshwar Mahadev Temple, Kanpur
 Kashi Vishwanath Temple, Varanasi, Uttar Pradesh

West Bengal 

 Mahakal Temple, Darjeeling
 Tarakeswar

External links 
 Pakshi Theertham
List of Shiva temples in India
List of Shiva temples in India - The Divine India
Famous Indian Shiv Temple Rameshwar Mahadev Of Bundi Rajasthan - Jai Bhole

References

 

Shiva temples